SS-Truppenübungsplatz Böhmen was one of Waffen-SS training area in the territory of Protectorate of Bohemia and Moravia in time of World War II. Originally was called SS-Truppenübungsplatz Beneschau, because it was situated near city of Benešov.

SS units from SS-Truppenübungsplatz Böhmen were used to form Kampfgruppe Wallenstein, which was used in unsuccessful suppression of General Andrey Vlasov's Liberation army during Prague Uprising.

Military units and formations of the Waffen-SS
Protectorate of Bohemia and Moravia
Benešov District